The 1997–98 Liverpool F.C. season was the 106th season in the club's existence, and their 36th consecutive year in the top-flight of English football. In addition to the Premier League, the club also competed in the FA Cup, League Cup, and the UEFA Cup.

Season summary
Liverpool's season saw them feature regularly in the title race, though in the end they just couldn't get the better of champions Arsenal and runners-up Manchester United. But the real success of the season was the emergence of 18-year-old striker Michael Owen. The Chester-born youngster had impressed in a handful of appearances during 1996–97, but his impact during 1997–98 was outstanding—18 goals from 36 Premier League games, especially after Robbie Fowler was ruled out for much of the campaign with a broken leg. In midfield, the arrival of Paul Ince sought to add steel to a side creatively centred on playmaker Steve McManaman, but the team were at the peak of their Spice Boys era, and underachieved in the end, eventually finishing in third place – meaning that Liverpool would be challenging in the UEFA Cup for 1998–99.

Players

First-team squad

Reserve squad

Statistics

Appearances and Goals

|-
! colspan=14 style=background:#dcdcdc; text-align:center| Goalkeepers

|-
! colspan=14 style=background:#dcdcdc; text-align:center| Defenders

|-
! colspan=14 style=background:#dcdcdc; text-align:center| Midfielders

|-
! colspan=14 style=background:#dcdcdc; text-align:center| Forwards

|-
! colspan=14 style=background:#dcdcdc; text-align:center| Players transferred out during the season

Goalscorers

Competition top scorers

Premier League

League table

Results by round

Matches

FA Cup

Matches

League Cup

Matches

UEFA Cup

Matches

Notes

External links
LFChistory.net

Liverpool F.C. seasons
Liverpool